Innocent Man is the second studio album by British hip hop and R&B recording artist Mark Morrison, and released in the UK with a limited edition DVD release. It's Morrison's second full-length studio album and first since Return of the Mack in 1996.

The album was originally slated for an 29 April 2002 release on Death Row Records with promotional copies and album samplers of the project being released, however the album was shelved due to label conflicts. In December 2004, Morrison attempted to release the album through his then-label 2 Wikid Records, but this did not happen as the project was again put on hold due to the label owner having disagreements with Morrison. The project was set for an April 2005 release, but it was again pushed back until 2006 when it was finally released on his own independent record label. The album subsequently failed to chart.

Critical reception
The album received mixed reviews. The Guardian gave it three stars, describing it as a "credible return". The Independents view was indifferent.

Track listing
 "Innocent Man" featuring DMX
 "Blackstabbers" featuring Daz Dillinger and Tray Deee
 "Dance 4 Me" featuring Tanya Stephens
 "Lately" featuring Elephant Man
 "Friday"
 "Nigga Ain't No Good"
 "Best Friend" featuring Gabrielle and Conner Reeves
 "Just a Man"
 "Time To Creep" featuring Isyss
 "Love You Bad"
 "That's Life"
 "Damn Damn Damn" featuring Adina Howard
 "Wanna Be Your Man"
 "Journeys" featuring Mica Paris and All Saints Road Community Choir
 "Just a Man" featuring Alexander O'Neal 
 "Innocent Man" featuring Tippa Irie

References

External links
Mark Morrison Official site
Mark Morrison Official MySpace

2006 albums
Mark Morrison albums